BIAT may refer to:

 Biat language, a variation of Mnong
 Banque Internationale Arabe de Tunisie
 Boston Institute for Arts Therapy; see A Bing Bang Holidang
 British Institute of Architectural Technologists, an earlier name for the Chartered Institute of Architectural Technologists

See also
 , the Gascon name for Saint-Béat, Haut-Garonne, France
 Biate (town), a town in India